This is a list of geographic centers of each U.S. state and inhabited territory. The geographic center of the United States is northeast of Belle Fourche in Butte County, South Dakota , while that of the contiguous 48 states is near Lebanon in Smith County, Kansas . The geographic center of North America lies near Rugby, North Dakota , though this designation has no official status. In 2017, a new calculation of the geographic center of North America placed it near the town of Center, North Dakota.

Historic list of geographic centers 
The list given below has been only slightly modified since it was first produced by the U.S. Geological Survey (USGS) in the early 1920s. At that time, the center for a state was found by suspending a cardboard cutout of the state by a string, and then drawing a vertical line from the suspension point. After rotating the cutout 90 degrees and drawing another vertical line from the new suspension point, the intersection of the two vertical lines was used as the geographic center. The result is dependent upon the type of projection used.

Modern list of geographic centers 
Although there have been different definitions offered for the geographic center, an intuitive one, and one used by the USGS, is "the center of gravity of the surface, or that point on which the surface of the area would balance if it were a plane of uniform thickness." An updated list of geographic centers using this definition (which is equivalent to the state's centroid) is given below.  It was derived by minimizing the sum of squared great circle distances from all points of land in a state (including islands, but not coastal waters, following the earlier practice of the USGS). It represents a slight improvement over the list originally published.

Geographic centers of the U.S. territories
Very little information exists about the geographic centers of the U.S. territories. In a geological survey of all geographic centers in the U.S., the U.S. Department of the Interior did not measure the geographic centers of the U.S. territories. Similarly, the USGS does not include the territories in its list of geographic centers. In terms of each territory’s land area, only one territory, Puerto Rico, has a confirmed geographic center. There are also official geographic centers of territorial exclusive economic zones, though those geographic centers are based on a territory's territorial waters (not land area).

See also
 Geographic center of the contiguous United States
 Geographic center of the United States
 List of extreme points of the United States
 List of extreme points of U.S. states and territories
 List of U.S. states and territories by elevation
 Mean center of the United States population
 Median center of United States population

Notes

References

Works cited
 
 

United States
Geography of the United States
Lists of coordinates
United States geography-related lists by state